The Journal of Law and Commerce is a law review published by an independent student group at the University of Pittsburgh School of Law, focusing on domestic and international commercial and business law. The journal is published biannually, with recent issues available online. The journal is published by the University Library System at the University of Pittsburgh as part of its D-Scribe Digital Publishing program.

Founded in 1980, the journal's focus on commercial, business, tax, and corporate law reflects the law school's interests in those areas. The journal dedicates a portion of each volume to issues regarding the United Nations Convention on Contracts for the International Sale of Goods. Due to the international nature of this research, the journal translates these issues into several languages.

Notable contributors
E. Allan Farnsworth
John E. Murray, Jr.
Dick Thornburgh
William Edward Sell
Ruggero J. Aldisert
Anita Hill

References

External links
 
 Washington & Lee Law School Law Review Impact Rankings

American law journals
Publications established in 1980
University of Pittsburgh student publications
Biannual journals
English-language journals
Law journals edited by students
Academic journals published by university libraries